Farish Alston Jenkins (May 19, 1940 – November 11, 2012) was a professor at Harvard University who studied and taught paleontology.  His discoveries included a transitional creature with characteristics of both fish and land animals — Tiktaalik roseae —and one of the earliest known frogs, Prosalirus bitis.

Early life
Farish Jenkins was born in Manhattan on May 19, 1940.  He was the oldest of three sons of a marketing executive but was raised by his grandmother in Colorado while his father served in World War II.

While he was a student at Princeton, studying geology, Jenkins met Eleanor Tracy.  He later married her and they had two children — Henry Edgar and Katherine Temperance.  He obtained a master's and doctorate from Yale and served as a captain in the United States Marine Corps.  
											
As a graduate student at Yale, Jenkins took a trip to Nairobi where he is said to have taken his first interest in live animal research: "At the time, black rhinos in the bush were as thick as rats in a dump.  With my camera set on self-timer, I managed to pose with one before the beast came on with a charge. I barely made it back to my Morris Minor in time, lost a lens cap on the way, but became, as a result of those three weeks, as much intrigued by living vertebrates as by their extinct relatives."

Academic career
He went on to teach at both Columbia and Harvard. In his later life, Jenkins served at Harvard as a professor of biology, the Alexander Agassiz Professor of Zoology and curator of vertebrate paleontology at the Museum of Comparative Zoology.

Jenkins made numerous expeditions to the Arctic, including a dozen expeditions to the Triassic of Jameson Land in Greenland, and to other sites from East Africa to Wyoming. He is credited as having helped explain the fish-to-tetrapod evolutionary transition as he helped discover the 375 million year old Tiktaalik roseae.

Jenkins was known for his eccentricity as a professor.  When lecturing on the subject of gait, he would illustrate this by walking on a peg leg as the character Captain Ahab from Herman Melville's Moby Dick.  When on expedition, he would dress in the dashing style of Indiana Jones and carry a high-powered rifle.

He used cineradiography to take internal pictures of animals moving in various ways. These could be quite elaborate and exciting, using treadmills and a wind tunnel.  "Tree shrews ricocheted across my bookshelves and desk," he reminisced.

After being diagnosed with cancer, he said "as a paleontologist, I'm familiar with extinction."  He died from pneumonia at Brigham and Women's Hospital on November 11, 2012.

References

American paleontologists
1940 births
2012 deaths
Harvard University faculty
Princeton University alumni
Yale University alumni
Columbia University faculty